The 2017 CONCACAF Boys' Under-15 Championship was an international football tournament, the second edition of the CONCACAF Boys' Under-15 Championship.

The competition was set to feature up to 40 teams from the CONCACAF region.

All times EDT (UTC−4).

Teams
A total of 39 teams from CONCACAF competed.

Division 1 (8 teams)

Division 2 (15 teams)

Division 3 (16 teams)

Venues
The competition took place at the IMG Academy in Bradenton, Florida, United States.

Format
Each match shall last 70 minutes, comprising two periods of 35 minutes with an interval of 10 minutes in between. In the championship game, if the score is tied at the end of regulation time, two 10 minute overtime periods will be played. If the score is still tied at the end of overtime, kicks from the penalty mark shall be taken to determine the winner.

In Division 1, the eight teams are divided into two groups of four. After the group stage, the top two teams of each group advance to the semi-finals, where the winners advance to the final, while the remaining teams play in a final round classification match depending on their position.

In Division 2, the 15 teams are divided into three groups of four and one group of three. After the group stage, each team play in a final round classification match depending on their position (except the fourth-placed team of Group F).

In Division 3, the 16 teams are divided into four groups of four. After the group stage, each team play in a final round classification match depending on their position.

Tiebreakers
The following tiebreaking criteria were established by CONCACAF:
Greatest number of points obtained in all group matches
Goal difference in all group matches
Greatest number of goals scored in all group matches
Greatest number of points obtained in matches amongst teams still tied
Lots drawn

Squads
Players born on or after 1 January 2002 are eligible to compete in the tournament. Each team could submit a squad of 18 players, two of whom must be goalkeepers (Regulations XIV.).

Division 1

Group stage

Group A

Group B

Knockout stage

Semi-finals

5th place

7th place

Final

Division 2

Group stage

Group C

Group D

Group E

Group F

Knockout stage

1st to 4th place
Winners promoted to Division 1 (this is not confirmed by CONCACAF).

5th to 8th place

9th to 12th place

13th to 15th place

Division 3

Group stage

Group G

Group H

Group I

Group J

Knockout stage

1st to 4th place
Winners promoted to Division 2 (this is not confirmed by CONCACAF).

5th to 8th place

9th to 12th place

13th to 16th place

References

External links
Under 15s – Boys, CONCACAF.com

CONCACAF competitions
Boys' Under-15 Championship
International association football competitions hosted by the United States
CONCACAF Boys' Under-15 Championship
CONCACAF Boys' Under-15 Championship
CONCACAF Boys' Under-15 Championship
Sports in Bradenton, Florida
CONCACAF Boys' Under-15 Championship